The Östra Torp Church is a church building in Smygehamn, Sweden. Belonging to the Källtorp Parish of the Church of Sweden, it inaugurated on 14 June 1911. replacing an older church which had been destroyed by a 1909 fire. The church is the southernmost in Sweden.

References

External links

20th-century Church of Sweden church buildings
Churches in Skåne County
Churches completed in 1911
Churches in the Diocese of Lund